Rzyszczewo  is a village in the administrative district of Gmina Białogard, within Białogard County, West Pomeranian Voivodeship, in north-western Poland.

See also
History of Pomerania

References

Villages in Białogard County